Bohnke is a diminutive of the German language occupational surname Bohn for a grower of beans. Notable people with the name include:
 Emil Bohnke (1888–1928), German violist, composer and conductor
 Felix Bohnke (1974), German musician

References 

German-language surnames
Occupational surnames